Tryin' to Outrun the Wind is the sixth studio album by American actor and country music artist John Schneider. It was released in 1985 via MCA Records. The album includes the singles "It's a Short Walk from Heaven to Hell" and "I'm Gonna Leave You Tomorrow".

Track listing

Personnel
Adapted from liner notes.

Matt Betton - drums
Michael Black - background vocals
Larry Byrom - guitar
Thom Flora - background vocals
Hoot Hester - fiddle
John Barlow Jarvis - keyboards
Terry Mead - trumpet
Larry Muhoberac - keyboards
Tom Robb - bass guitar
John Schneider - lead vocals, background vocals
Curtis Young - background vocals
Reggie Young - guitar

Chart performance

References

1985 albums
John Schneider (screen actor) albums
Albums produced by Jimmy Bowen
MCA Records albums